Issue is a comics anthology magazine published by Daiwon C.I. in South Korea. Below is a list of all titles serialized in the magazine and published under its book imprint, Issue Comics.  Titles are separated into domestic publications and translated works licensed from foreign publishing companies.

Domestic titles

Licensed titles

Manhwa magazines
Lists of mass media in South Korea
Issue